Mikaniopsis is a genus of African flowering plant in the groundsel tribe within the sunflower family.

 Species

References

 
Asteraceae genera
Flora of Africa
Taxonomy articles created by Polbot